Allira is a given name. Notable people with the name include:

 Allira Hudson-Gofers (born 1982), Australian team handball player
 Allira Toby (born 1994), Australian soccer player

See also
 Allera

Feminine given names